Leonard Lewis Lindsay (April 6, 1909 – December 16, 1988), nicknamed "Sloppy", was an American Negro league first baseman between 1935 and 1946.

A native of Greensboro, North Carolina, Lindsay made his Negro leagues debut in 1935 for the Newark Dodgers. In 1943, he split time between the Cincinnati Clowns and Birmingham Black Barons, and started all seven games of the 1943 Negro World Series for Birmingham. Lindsay finished his career in 1946 with the Indianapolis Clowns. He died in Salisbury, North Carolina in 1988 at age 79.

References

External links
 and Seamheads

1909 births
1988 deaths
Birmingham Black Barons players
Cincinnati Clowns players
Indianapolis Clowns players
Newark Dodgers players
Baseball first basemen
Baseball players from Greensboro, North Carolina
20th-century African-American sportspeople